Sir David de Graham of Kincardine (died 1327) was a 13th-14th century Scottish noble.

David was the son of Patrick de Graham of Kincardine and Annabella de Strathearn. He fought with his father at the Battle of Dunbar on 27 April 1296, where he was captured and became a prisoner of King Edward I of England until 1297. His father Patrick died during the battle. David received from King Robert I of Scotland, in consideration of his good and faithful services several grants of land. He signed the Declaration of Arbroath in 1320. Robert I exchanged the Graham lands at Cardross for those of Old Montrose with David in March 1326. He died in 1327.

Family and issue
David is known to have had the following issue;
David of Kincardine and Old Montrose
Patrick of Kinpunt
Margaret

Citations

References

13th-century Scottish people
14th-century Scottish people
Medieval Scottish knights
Scottish people of the Wars of Scottish Independence
Signatories to the Declaration of Arbroath
David